Ferrous citrate, also known as iron(II) citrate or iron(2+) citrate, describes coordination complexes containing citrate anions with Fe2+ formed in aqueous solution.  Although a number of complexes are possible (or even likely), only one complex has been crystallized.  That complex is the coordination polymer with the formula [Fe(H2O)6]2+{[Fe(C6H5O7)(H2O)]−}2.2H2O, where C6H5O73- is HOC(CH2CO2−)2(CO2−, i.e., the triple conjugate base of citric acid wherein the three carboxylic acid groups are ionized. Ferrous citrates are all paramagnetic, reflecting the weak crystal field of the carboxylate ligands. 

Ferrous citrates are produced by treating disodium citrate  with sources of iron(II) aquo complexes, such as iron(II) sulfate.  Ferrous citrates are all highly unstable in air, converting to ferric citrates.

It is a nutrient supplement approved by the FDA.

See also
 Iron(III) citrate
 Ammonium ferric citrate

References

Iron(II) compounds

Citrates